Oleksii Lesyk (born March 3, 1992) is a Ukrainian male acrobatic gymnast. With partners Oleksandr Nelep, Andrii Kozynko and Viktor Iaremchuk, Lesyk achieved 5th in the 2014 Acrobatic Gymnastics World Championships.

References

External links
 

1992 births
Living people
Ukrainian acrobatic gymnasts
Male acrobatic gymnasts